Randy Myers (born March 29, 1967) is an Emmy Award-winning American animator and animation director best known for his animation direction work on Samurai Jack and The Powerpuff Girls. His other works include The Grim Adventures of Billy and Mandy, Foster's Home for Imaginary Friends, Dexter's Laboratory, Cats Don't Dance, The Iron Giant, My Life as a Teenage Robot, The Fairly OddParents, G.I. Joe: Renegades, among others. He was the supervising producer on We Bare Bears.

In 2004, he won an Emmy for Outstanding Animated Program for his direction of Samurai Jack.

In 2005, Myers won an Emmy for Outstanding Animated Program for his work on the television show Star Wars: Clone Wars.

References

External links

Interview from 2014 

Place of birth missing (living people)
1967 births
Living people
American animated film directors
American television directors
American animators
Primetime Emmy Award winners